The 2011 European Junior and U23 Canoe Slalom Championships took place in Banja Luka, Bosnia and Herzegovina from 14 to 17 July 2011 under the auspices of the European Canoe Association (ECA). It was the 13th edition of the competition for Juniors (U18) and the 9th edition for the Under 23 category. A total of 18 medal events took place. No medals were awarded for the junior women's C1 team event due to low number of participating countries. The U23 women's C1 team event did not take place.

Medal summary

Men

Canoe

Junior

U23

Kayak

Junior

U23

Women

Canoe

Junior

U23

Kayak

Junior

U23

Medal table

References

External links
European Canoe Association

European Junior and U23 Canoe Slalom Championships
European Junior and U23 Canoe Slalom Championships